Harry Bruce may refer to:

 Harry Bruce (academic), professor and Dean of the Information School at the University of Washington
 Harry Bruce (politician) (1868–1958), Australian politician
 Harry Bruce (footballer, born 1905) (1905–?), English footballer
 Harry Bruce (Australian footballer) (1895–1977), Australian footballer for Melbourne

See also 
 Henry Bruce (disambiguation)